Amministrazione delle Finanze v Simmenthal SpA (1978) Case 106/77 is an EU law case, concerning the conflict of law between a national legal system and European Union law.

Facts
Simmenthal SpA imported beef from France into Italy. Italy imposed a public health inspection fee for the meat crossing the frontier under an Italian Law of 1970. This conflicted with European Community Regulations from 1964 and 1968.

Italian courts heard argument that Italian law must prevail because it was passed after the Regulations, and must be applied by the Italian courts until the law was declared unconstitutional. It referred the question of what to do in a case of conflict to the ECJ. The Attorney General Reischl gave an Opinion suggesting that timing of the Italian law was irrelevant, and EU law was supreme.

Judgment
The ECJ held that the national court had a duty to give full effect to Community provisions, even if a conflicting national law was adopted later.

See also

European Union law

Notes

References
G Gaja, 'New Developments in a Continuing Story: The Relationship between EEC Law and Italian Law' (1990) 27 CMLR 83

Court of Justice of the European Union case law
1978 in case law
1978 in Italy
Italian case law